Malthonea glaucina is a species of beetle in the family Cerambycidae. It was described by Thomson in 1868. It is known from Ecuador and Venezuela.

References

Desmiphorini
Beetles described in 1868